WCHP (760 AM) is a radio station broadcasting a Christian radio format branded as WCHP 760 AM. Licensed to Champlain, New York, United States, the station directs its daytime signal into nearby Montreal, Quebec, Canada, effectively being a border blaster. At night, the station broadcasts at a considerably lower power, to protect WJR in Detroit, Michigan. The station is owned by Champlain Radio, Inc.

History
The station was assigned the call letters WGGD on November 14, 1984. On December 19, 1984, the station changed its call sign to the current WCHP. The station signed on August 20, 1985.

References

External links

CHP
Radio stations established in 1985
1985 establishments in New York (state)